William Thoyts (1767–1817) was High Sheriff of Berkshire.

William was born in 1767 in Bishopsgate, the son of John Thoyts of Sulhamstead House in Berkshire and his wife, Mary, the daughter of Thomas Burfoot, the Treasurer of Christ's Hospital. He inherited his father's estates, centred on Sulhamstead Abbots, at the age of only eight and shortly afterwards united them with the manor of Sulhamstead Bannister. In 1788, he married Jane, the daughter and co-heiress of Abram Newman of Mount Bures, Essex, the famous London tea merchant. They had a large family of ten children, including Jane, the wife of William Best, 2nd Baron Wynford, and their heir, Mortimer George Thoyts, who was the grandfather of the palaeographer, historian and genealogist, Emma Elizabeth Thoyts.

In 1795, William became High Sheriff of Berkshire. In 1800, he rebuilt the family home largely as it stands today, minus the famous portico. William died in November 1817 and was buried in the family vault beneath St Mary's Church, Sulhamstead Abbots.

References
British History Online: Victoria County History of Berkshire
May Family History: Sulhamstead House

1767 births
1817 deaths
High Sheriffs of Berkshire
People from Sulhamstead
People from the City of London